Common Jasmine Orange is the fifth studio album by Taiwanese singer Jay Chou, released on 3 August 2004 by Sony Music Taiwan.

The album was nominated for six Golden Melody Awards. The album won for an IFPI Hong Kong Top Sales Music Award for Best Selling Mandarin Album of the Year. According to IFPI, The album is also listed at number 43 of 2004's global best-selling albums.

The tracks, "Common Jasmine Orange", "Excuse", and "Wounds of War", are listed at number 1, number 10, and number 88 respectively on the 2004's Hit FM Top 100 Singles of the Year chart.

Track listing

Awards

References

External links
  Jay Chou discography@JVR Music

2004 albums
Jay Chou albums
Sony Music Taiwan albums